The Annunciation Church is a Cultural Monument of Albania, located in Kozarë, Berat County. It became a Cultural Monument in 1963.

References

Cultural Monuments of Albania
Buildings and structures in Kuçovë